The 1888 United States elections occurred during the Third Party System, and elected the members of the 51st United States Congress. North Dakota, South Dakota, Montana, Washington, Idaho, and Wyoming were admitted during the 51st Congress. This election was the first time that one party had won a majority in both chambers of Congress since the 1874 elections.

In the Presidential election, Democratic President Grover Cleveland was defeated by Republican former Senator Benjamin Harrison of Indiana. At the 1888 Republican National Convention, Harrison was nominated on the eighth ballot, defeating Ohio Senator John Sherman, former Governor Russell A. Alger of Michigan, and several other candidates. As in 1876, the Republican candidate won the presidency despite the Democratic candidate's greater share of the popular vote, albeit, also as in 1876, with widespread allegations of voter suppression and fraud aimed at Republican black voters in the South. This situation would not be repeated until the 2000 election. Despite the popular vote margin, Harrison won a comfortable majority of the electoral college, and took most of the states outside the South.

Despite the close presidential race, Republicans picked up several seats in both houses of Congress. Republicans won major gains in the House, re-taking the majority for the first time since the 1882 elections. In the Senate, the Republicans won major gains, growing their majority in the chamber.

See also
1888 United States presidential election
1888 United States House of Representatives elections
1888–89 United States Senate elections

References

1888 elections in the United States
1888